The Pirates of the Mississippi (German: Die Flußpiraten vom Mississippi) is a  Western film directed by Jürgen Roland and starring Hansjörg Felmy, Brad Harris and Sabine Sinjen. A Eurowestern, it was a co-production between West Germany, France and Italy. Based on the 1847 novel by Friedrich Gerstäcker, the film was the first pairing of Brad Harris and Tony Kendall with Gianfranco Parolini as a second unit director. Kendall reprised his role of Chief Black Eagle in Black Eagle of Santa Fe (1965).

The film's sets were designed by the art directors Hans Berthel and Johannes Ott.

Plot
Based on an island in the Mississippi River a pirate gang terrorize the town of Helena and the steamboats. Sheriff James Lively can't stop pirate boss Kelly from tricking the Cherokees into helping him attack a steamboat with a precious cargo.

Cast
 Hansjörg Felmy as Sheriff James Lively  
 Brad Harris as Tom Cook  
 Sabine Sinjen as Evelyn  
 Horst Frank as Kelly  
 Dorothee Parker as Georgia  
 Karl Lieffen as Doc Monrove  
 Tony Kendall as Schwarzer Adler  
 Barbara Simon as Wichita  
 Luigi Batzella as Squire Dayton 
 Jeannette Batti as Mrs. Bridleford  
 Dan Vadis as Blackfoot  
 Danilo Turk as Uncle Jonathan  
 Vladimir Bacic as Frank

Release
The Pirates of the Mississippi was released in France on 13 October 1965. It passed German censors on 18 October 1963 and was released to television in West Germany on 22 June 1969.

References

Bibliography
 Pitts, Michael R. Western Movies: A Guide to 5,105 Feature Films. McFarland, 2012.

External links
 

1963 films
French Western (genre) films
Italian Western (genre) films
German Western (genre) films
Spaghetti Western films
1963 Western (genre) films
1960s historical films
West German films
Films directed by Jürgen Roland
Films set in the 19th century
Films set in Arkansas
Films based on German novels
Gloria Film films
1960s Italian films
1960s French films
1960s German films